Niño Valdés (born Geraldo Ramos Ponciano Valdés, also known as Nino Valdés) (December 5, 1924 – June 3, 2001) was a Cuban professional boxer who was Cuba's national heavyweight boxing champion in the 1940s and 1950s. Statistical boxing website BoxRec rates Valdés as the 8th best Cuban boxer ever across all weight divisions.

Professional career

Heavyweight contender

Valdés was a top contender for the heavyweight title during the mid 1950s, although he never received a shot due to his mixed results in the ring.  Ring Magazine ranked Valdez as high as the #2 contender in its annual rankings for 1958 and he was highly ranked in several other years.
 
After a string of four losses to notable fighters such as Harold Johnson, Archie Moore, and Bob Baker in 1952 and 1953, he went undefeated in an impressive run of 11 consecutive victories which saw him defeat Ezzard Charles and Tommy "Hurricane" Jackson. However, the streak came to an end when he lost a rematch to Moore by a fifteen-round unanimous decision on May 2, 1955.  He lost another fight to Bob Satterfield three months later. After beating former title contender Don Cockell, he lost a ten-round unanimous decision to Bob Baker on December 7, 1955, costing him a potential title bout against Rocky Marciano.

Later career and retirement

He continued boxing, losing to heavyweight contenders Zora Folley, Eddie Machen, and Sonny Liston.  After defeating contender Brian London in December 1959, Valdés retired due to eye problems.

After retirement, he worked as a security guard and a bouncer.

Professional boxing record

References

External links
 

1924 births
2001 deaths
Heavyweight boxers
Boxers from Havana
Cuban male boxers